Thomas Finchum (born December 1, 1989) is an American country musician and former platform diver. He was a member of the 2008 U.S. Olympic team. Finchum announced his retirement from diving in 2012. He is now pursuing a country music career.

Diving career
At the 2008 Summer Olympics, Finchum and David Boudia placed fifth in the 10-meter synchronized diving competition. Finchum finished 12th in the individual 10-meter event.

At the 2011 U.S. National Championships, Finchum and Drew Livingston won the 10-meter synchronized men platform title. At the World Championships, he and Boudia were bronze medalists in 2007 and silver medalists in 2009.

Music career
On June 24, 2012, the day after he failed to qualify for the 2012 Summer Olympics, Finchum announced his retirement from competitive diving. He said he would move to Nashville, Tennessee, where he will attend Belmont University and pursue a country music career

References

External links
 

Divers at the 2007 Pan American Games
Divers at the 2008 Summer Olympics
Divers at the 2011 Pan American Games
Olympic divers of the United States
Sportspeople from Indianapolis
1989 births
Living people
American Lutherans
People from Beech Grove, Indiana
World Aquatics Championships medalists in diving
Pan American Games gold medalists for the United States
Pan American Games medalists in diving
Medalists at the 2007 Pan American Games